Lee Paul Briers (born 14 June 1978) is a professional rugby league coach who is on the coaching staff of the Brisbane Broncos in the NRL, and a former Wales international rugby league footballer who played in the 1990s, 2000s and 2010s. 

St Helens
Briers started his career with hometown club St. Helens, and he made his début in 1997 at the age of 18, standing in for suspended captain Bobbie Goulding.

Immediately prior to being recalled by St Helens for his début, Lee had been on loan at AS Carcassonne to gain some valuable first team match experience, along with three other academy youngsters, namely, Nick Devine, Danny Rigby and Richard Shields

He made six appearances for the Saints club, scoring one try and 24 goals, with his performances helping Saints to reach the 1997 Challenge Cup Final. Briers was dropped following the return of Goulding to the starting lineup, and learned that he might not even be included in the squad for the upcoming Challenge Cup final. Seeking regular first-team football, he joined Warrington Wolves in April 1997 for a fee of £65,000.

Warrington
Briers made an instant impact at his new club. His presence as a  added an attacking edge to the Warrington team and he was nominated for Young Player of the Year in his first season at Wilderspool Stadium. Having made his Wales début in 1998, Briers went on to make 23 appearances for his country and featured in the 2000 Rugby League World Cup. Briers was capped by Great Britain against France in their 42-12 win on 26 October 2001. Briers went on to become the primary playmaker of the Warrington team, and was named as captain in 2003. During that time Briers became well known for his excellent kicking skills and his ability to successfully convert drop goals. He currently holds the Super League record, and jointly Warrington all-time record (with Paul Bishop), for the most drop goals in a game (5 against Halifax at the Shay in 2002).

Briers' Testimonial match at Warrington took place in 2007 and he stepped down as captain at the end of the season. Following the Wales team's failure to qualify for the 2008 Rugby League World Cup, Briers announced his international retirement. 

Briers played in the 2010 Challenge Cup Final victory over the Leeds Rhinos at Wembley Stadium.

Briers came out of international retirement to represent Wales in the 2010 European Cup, and captained the side to victory in the tournament. He went on to captain Wales in the 2011 Four Nations, before once again retiring from international rugby league at the tournament's end.

The 2011 Super League season was Briers' 14th. During this season he broke a number of club records including top all-time points scorer, having overtaken club greats Brian Bevan, and Steve Hesford. He broke the record during a Challenge Cup home 112–0 demolition of Swinton. This match also saw Briers break his own club record for points in a match (set 11 years earlier against York), with 44 points, from 16 goals and three tries. 

He played in the 2012 Challenge Cup Final victory over the Leeds Rhinos at Wembley Stadium.

He played in the 2012 Super League Grand Final defeat by the Leeds Rhinos at Old Trafford.

In 2013, during the second match of the season against Wigan Warriors, Lee suffered a neck injury which saw the Warrington ace out for 13 games. He returned for a Tetley's Challenge Cup fifth round tie against Salford City Reds in which he made not only a try scoring return but also kicked his 1,000th career goal.

He played in the 2013 Super League Grand Final defeat by the Wigan Warriors at Old Trafford.

In November 2013, although Briers had a year remaining on his contract, he announced his retirement due to a neck injury. He played 425 games for Warrington, scoring a club record 2,586 points. Shortly before announcing his retirement, Briers released his autobiography, Off the Cuff.

References

External links

!Great Britain Statistics at englandrl.co.uk (statistics currently missing due to not having appeared for both Great Britain, and England)
Profile at warringtonwolves.com
(archived by web.archive.org) 2001 Ashes profile
Warrington’s World Cup heroes – Lee Briers
Profile at saints.org.uk

1978 births
Living people
AS Carcassonne players
English rugby league coaches
English rugby league players
Great Britain national rugby league team players
Lancashire rugby league team players
Lance Todd Trophy winners
Rugby league five-eighths
Rugby league halfbacks
Rugby league players from St Helens, Merseyside
St Helens R.F.C. players
Wales national rugby league team captains
Wales national rugby league team players
Warrington Wolves captains
Warrington Wolves players